The 2004 NHL Entry Draft was the 42nd NHL Entry Draft. It was held on June 26 and 27, 2004 at the RBC Center in Raleigh, North Carolina. It is especially notable because it was the last NHL event to take place before the beginning of the lockout, which canceled all the games scheduled for the 2004–05 NHL season.

Final central scouting rankings

Skaters

Goaltenders

Selections by round

Round one

The Columbus Blue Jackets' first-round pick went to the Carolina Hurricanes as the result of a trade on June 26, 2004 that sent Carolina's first-round pick in 2004 (8th overall) and Toronto's second-round pick in 2004 (59th overall) to Columbus in exchange for this pick.
The Carolina Hurricanes' first-round pick went to the Columbus Blue Jackets as the result of a trade on June 26, 2004 that sent Columbus' first-round pick in 2004 (4th overall) to Carolina in exchange for Toronto's second-round pick in 2004 (59th overall) and this pick.
The Calgary Flames' first-round pick went to the New York Rangers as the result of a trade on June 25, 2004 that sent Toronto's first-round pick in 2004 (24th overall) and New York's compensatory second-round pick in 2004 (46th overall) to Calgary in exchange for Calgary's eighth-round pick in 2004 (247th overall) and this pick.
The Dallas Stars' first-round pick went to the New Jersey Devils as the result of a trade on June 26, 2004 that sent New Jersey's first-round pick in 2004 (22nd overall) and their third-round pick in 2004 (88th overall) to Dallas in exchange for this pick.
The New Jersey Devils' first-round pick went to the San Jose Sharks as the result of a trade on June 26, 2004 that sent San Jose's first-round pick in 2004 (28th overall) and San Jose's compensatory second-round and third-round picks in 2004 (52nd and 91st overall) to Dallas in exchange for Dallas' fifth-round pick in 2004 (153rd overall) and this pick.
Dallas previously acquired this pick as the result of a trade on June 26, 2004 that sent Dallas' first-round pick in 2004 (20th overall) to New Jersey in exchange for New Jersey's third-round pick in 2004 (88th overall) and this pick.
The Toronto Maple Leafs' first-round pick went to the Calgary Flames as the result of a trade on June 25, 2004 that sent Calgary's first-round pick in 2004 (19th overall) and Calgary's eighth-round pick in 2004 (247th overall) to the New York Rangers in exchange for New York's compensatory second-round pick in 2004 (46th overall) and this pick.
New York previously acquired this pick as the result of a trade on March 3, 2004 that sent Brian Leetch and future considerations (Edmonton's fourth-round pick in 2004) to Toronto in exchange for Maxim Kondratyev, Jarkko Immonen, Toronto's second-round pick in 2005 and this pick.
The Philadelphia Flyers' first-round pick went to the Edmonton Oilers as the result of a trade on December 16, 2003 that sent Mike Comrie to Philadelphia in exchange for Jeff Woywitka, Philadelphia's third-round pick in 2005 and this pick.
The Boston Bruins' first-round pick went to the Washington Capitals as the result of a trade on March 3, 2004 that sent Sergei Gonchar to Boston in exchange for Shaone Morrisonn, Boston's second-round pick in 2004 (62nd overall) and this pick.
The San Jose Sharks' first-round pick went to the Dallas Stars as the result of a trade on June 26, 2004 that sent New Jersey's first-round pick in 2004 (22nd overall) and Dallas' fifth-round pick in 2004 (153rd overall) to San Jose in exchange for San Jose's compensatory second-round and third-round picks in 2004 (52nd and 91st overall) and this pick.
The Detroit Red Wings' first-round pick went to the Washington Capitals as the result of a trade on February 27, 2004 that sent Robert Lang to Detroit in exchange for Tomas Fleischmann, Detroit's fourth-round pick in 2006 and this pick.

Round two

 The Columbus Blue Jackets' second-round pick went to the Dallas Stars as the result of a trade on July 22, 2003 that sent Darryl Sydor to Columbus in exchange for Mike Sillinger and this pick.
 The Florida Panthers' second-round pick was re-acquired from the New York Rangers as the result of a trade on June 26, 2004 that sent Dallas' compensatory second-round pick in 2004 (50th overall) and Florida's third-round pick in 2004 (73rd overall) to New York in exchange for this pick.
New York previously acquired this pick as the result of a trade on March 8, 2004 that sent Matthew Barnaby and the Rangers' third-round pick in 2004 to Colorado in exchange for Chris McAllister, David Liffiton and this pick.
Colorado previously acquired this pick as the result of a trade on July 18, 2003 that sent Eric Messier and Vaclav Nedorost to Florida in exchange for Peter Worrell and this pick.
 The Los Angeles Kings' second-round pick went to the Chicago Blackhawks as the result of a trade on February 19, 2004 that sent Alexei Zhamnov and Washington's fourth-round pick in 2004 to Philadelphia in exchange for Jim Vandermeer, Colin Fraser and this pick.
Philadelphia previously acquired this pick as the result of a trade on May 28, 2003 that sent Roman Cechmanek to Los Angeles in exchange for this pick.
 The Nashville Predators' second-round pick went to the Chicago Blackhawks as the result of a trade on February 16, 2004 that sent Steve Sullivan to Nashville in exchange for Nashville's second-round pick in 2005 and this pick.
 The New York Rangers' compensatory second-round pick went to the Columbus Blue Jackets as the result of a trade on June 26, 2004 that sent Columbus and Tampa Bay's third-round picks in 2004 (70th and 98th overall) to Calgary in exchange for this pick.
Calgary previously acquired this pick as the result of a trade on June 25, 2004 that sent Calgary's first and eighth-round picks in 2004 (19th and 247th overall) to New York in exchange for Toronto's first-round pick in 2004 (24th overall) and this pick.
New York previously received the 16th pick of this round (46th overall) as compensation for not signing 2001 first-round draft pick R. J. Umberger. New York acquired the rights to Umberger from Vancouver on March 9, 2004.
 The Edmonton Oilers' compensatory second-round pick went to the New York Rangers as the result of a trade on March 3, 2004 that sent Petr Nedved and Jussi Markkanen to Edmonton in exchange for Steve Valiquette, Dwight Helminen and this pick.
Edmonton previously received this pick as compensation for the loss of Group III free agent Brian Leetch.
 The Dallas Stars' compensatory second-round pick went to the Phoenix Coyotes as the result of a trade on June 26, 2004 that sent Philadelphia's second-round pick and Edmonton's third-round pick both in 2004 (60th and 80th overall) to the New York Rangers in exchange for this pick.
New York previously acquired this pick as the result of a trade on June 26, 2004 that sent Florida's own second-round pick in 2004 (37th overall) back to the Panthers in exchange for Florida's third-round pick in 2004 (73rd overall) and this pick.
Florida previously acquired this pick as the result of a trade on March 8, 2004 that sent Valeri Bure to Dallas in exchange for Drew Bagnall and this pick.
Dallas previously received this pick as compensation for the loss of Group III free agent Derian Hatcher.
 The Montreal Canadiens' second-round pick went to the New York Rangers as the result of a trade on March 2, 2004 that sent Alexei Kovalev to Montreal in exchange for Jozef Balej and this pick.
 The San Jose Sharks' compensatory second-round pick went to the Dallas Stars as the result of a trade on June 26, 2004 that sent New Jersey's first-round pick and Dallas' fifth-round pick both in 2004 (22nd and 153rd overall) to San Jose in exchange for San Jose's first and compensatory third-round picks both in 2004 (28th and 91st overall) and this pick.
San Jose previously received this pick as compensation for the loss of Group III free agent Teemu Selanne.
 The Calgary Flames' second-round pick went to the Florida Panthers as the result of a trade on March 8, 2004 that sent Marcus Nilson to Calgary in exchange for this pick.
 The Dallas Stars' second-round pick went to the Chicago Blackhawks as the result of a trade on November 17, 2003 that sent Stephane Robidas and the New York Rangers' fourth-round pick in 2004 to Dallas in exchange for Jon Klemm and this pick.
 The Dallas Stars' received the 26th pick of this round (56th overall) as compensation for not signing 2002 first-round draft pick Martin Vagner.
 The New Jersey Devils' second-round pick went to the Edmonton Oilers as the result of a trade on June 26, 2004 that sent Jason Chimera and Edmonton's third-round pick in 2004 (80th overall) to Phoenix in exchange for Buffalo's fourth-round pick in 2004 (112th overall) and this pick.
Phoenix previously acquired this pick as the result of a trade on March 5, 2004 that sent Jan Hrdina to New Jersey in exchange for Michael Rupp and this pick.
 The Toronto Maple Leafs' second-round pick went to the Columbus Blue Jackets as the result of a trade on June 26, 2004 that sent Columbus' first-round pick in 2004 (4th overall) to Carolina in exchange for Carolina's first-round pick in 2004 (8th overall) and this pick.
Carolina previously acquired this pick as the result of a trade on March 9, 2003 that sent Glen Wesley to Toronto in exchange for this pick.
 The Philadelphia Flyers' second-round pick went to the New York Rangers as the result of a trade on June 26, 2004 that sent Dallas' compensatory second-round pick in 2004 (50th overall) to Phoenix in exchange for Edmonton's third-round pick in 2004 (80th overall) and this pick.
Phoenix previously acquired this pick as the result of a trade on March 10, 2003 that sent Tony Amonte to Philadelphia in exchange for Guillaume Lefebvre, Atlanta's third-round pick in 2003 and this pick.
 The Vancouver Canucks' second-round pick went to the Pittsburgh Penguins as the result of a trade August 25, 2003 that sent Johan Hedberg to Vancouver in exchange for this pick.
 The Boston Bruins' second-round pick went to the Washington Capitals as the result of a trade on March 3, 2004 that sent Sergei Gonchar to Boston in exchange for Shaone Morrisonn, Boston's first-round pick in 2004 and this pick.
 The San Jose Sharks' second-round pick went to the Boston Bruins as the result of a trade on June 26, 2004 that sent Boston's third and ninth-round picks and Tampa Bay's fourth-round pick all in 2004 (94th, 129th and 288th overall) to San Jose in exchange for this pick.
 The Detroit Red Wings' second-round pick went to the Boston Bruins as the result of a trade on June 20, 2003 that sent Jozef Stumpel and Boston's seventh-round pick in 2003 to Los Angeles in exchange for Philadelphia's fourth-round pick in 2003 and this pick.
Los Angeles previously acquired this pick as the result of a trade on March 11, 2003 that sent Mathieu Schneider to Detroit in exchange for Sean Avery, Maxim Kuznetsov, Detroit's first-round pick in 2003 and this pick.

Round three

 The Washington Capitals compensatory third-round pick was received due to the loss of Group III free agent Calle Johansson.
 The Washington Capitals' third-round pick went to the Carolina Hurricanes as the result of a trade on February 20, 2004 that sent Bob Boughner to Colorado in exchange for Chris Bahen, Colorado's fifth-round pick in 2005 and this pick.
Colorado previously acquired this pick as the result of a trade on October 22, 2003 that sent Bates Battaglia and Jonas Johansson to Washington in exchange for Steve Konowalchuk and this pick.
 The Columbus Blue Jackets' third-round pick went to the Calgary Flames as the result of a trade on June 26, 2004 that sent the New York Rangers compensatory second-round pick in 2004 (46th overall) to Columbus in exchange for Tampa Bay's third-round pick in 2004 (98th overall) and this pick.
 The Phoenix Coyotes' third-round pick went to the Buffalo Sabres as the result of a trade on March 10, 2003 that sent Chris Gratton and Buffalo's fourth-round pick in 2004 to Phoenix in exchange for Daniel Briere and this pick.
 The New York Rangers' third-round pick went to the Colorado Avalanche as the result of a trade on March 8, 2004 that sent Chris McAllister, David Liffiton and Florida's second-round pick in 2004 to New York in exchange for Matthew Barnaby and this pick.
 The Florida Panthers' third-round pick went to the New York Rangers as the result of a trade on June 26, 2004 that sent the Panthers' second-round pick in 2004 (37th overall) back to Florida in exchange for Dallas' compensatory second-round pick in 2004 (50th overall) and this pick.
 The Carolina Hurricanes' third-round pick went to the Mighty Ducks of Anaheim as the result of a trade on June 18, 2004 that sent Martin Gerber to Carolina in exchange for Tomas Malec and this pick.
 The Los Angeles Kings' third-round pick went to the Ottawa Senators as the result of a trade on June 26, 2004 that sent Radek Bonk to Los Angeles in exchange for this pick.
 The Buffalo Sabres' third-round pick went to the Minnesota Wild as the result of a trade on March 5, 2004 that sent Sergei Zholtok and Brad Bombardir to Nashville in exchange for Nashville's fourth-round pick in 2004 and this pick.
Nashville previously acquired this pick as the result of a trade on June 27, 2003 that sent Andy Delmore to Buffalo in exchange for this pick.
 The Edmonton Oilers' third-round pick went to the New York Rangers as the result of a trade on June 26, 2004 that sent Dallas' compensatory second-round pick in 2004 (50th overall) to Phoenix in exchange for Philadelphia's second-round pick in 2004 (60th overall) and this pick.
Phoenix previously acquired this pick as the result of a trade on June 26, 2004 that sent Phoenix's third-round pick in 2005 to Carolina in exchange for this pick.
Carolina previously acquired this pick as the result of a trade on June 21, 2003 that sent David Tanabe and Igor Knyazev to Phoenix in exchange for Danny Markov and this pick (being conditional at the time of the trade). The condition – If Phoenix acquired a 2004 third-round pick before the start of the third round, the pick would be transferred to Carolina – was converted on June 26, 2004 when Phoenix acquired a third-round pick in 2004 from Edmonton.
Phoenix previously acquired this pick as the result of a trade on June 26, 2004 that sent New Jersey's second-round pick and Buffalo's fourth-round pick both in 2004 (57th and 112th overall) to Edmonton in exchange for Jason Chimera and this pick.
 The Calgary Flames' third-round pick went to the Pittsburgh Penguins as the result of a trade on February 9, 2003 that sent Andrew Ference to Calgary in exchange for this pick (being conditional at the time of the trade). The condition and date of conversion are not known.
 The Colorado Avalanche's third-round pick went to the Ottawa Senators as the result of a trade on March 9, 2004 that sent Shane Hnidy to Nashville in exchange for this pick.
Nashville previously acquired this pick as the result of a trade on June 30, 2003 that sent Karlis Skrastins to Colorado in exchange for future considerations (that became this pick).
 The New Jersey Devils' third-round pick went to the Washington Capitals as the result of a trade on June 26, 2004 that sent Washington's third-round pick in 2005 to Dallas in exchange for this pick.
Dallas previously acquired this pick as the result of a trade on June 26, 2004 that sent Dallas' first-round pick in 2004 (20th overall) to New Jersey in exchange for the Devils' first-round pick in 2004 (22nd overall) and this pick.
 The San Jose Sharks compensatory third-round pick went to the Vancouver Canucks as the result of a trade on June 26, 2004 that sent Vancouver's third-round pick in 2005 to Dallas in exchange for this pick.
Dallas previously acquired this pick as the result of a trade on June 26, 2004 that sent New Jersey's first-round and Dallas' fifth-round picks in 2004 (22nd and 153rd overall) to San Jose in exchange for the Sharks first-round pick, compensatory second-round pick both in 2004 (28th and 52nd overall) and this pick.
San Jose previously received this pick as compensation for the loss of Group III free agent Mark Messier.
 The Vancouver Canucks' third-round pick went to the Columbus Blue Jackets as the result of a trade on March 9, 2004 that sent Geoff Sanderson to Vancouver in exchange for this pick.
 The Boston Bruins' third-round pick went to the San Jose Sharks as the result of a trade on June 26, 2004 that sent San Jose's second-round pick in 2004 (63rd overall) to Boston in exchange for Tampa Bay's fourth-round pick, Boston's ninth-round pick both in 2004 (129th and 288th overall) and this pick.
 The San Jose Sharks' third-round pick went to the Los Angeles Kings as the result of a trade on June 26, 2004 that sent Radek Bonk and Cristobal Huet to Montreal in exchange for Mathieu Garon and this pick.
Montreal previously acquired this pick as the result of a trade on January 22, 2003 that sent Jeff Hackett to San Jose in exchange for Niklas Sundstrom and this pick.
 The Columbus Blue Jackets compensatory third-round pick was received due to the loss of Group III free agent Ray Whitney.
 The Tampa Bay Lightning's third-round pick went to the Calgary Flames as the result of a trade on June 26, 2004 that sent the New York Rangers compensatory second-round pick in 2004 (46th overall) to Columbus in exchange for the Blue Jackets' third-round pick in 2004 (70th overall) and this pick.
Columbus previously acquired this pick as the result of a trade on January 27, 2004 that sent Darryl Sydor and Columbus' fourth-round pick in 2004 to Tampa Bay in exchange for Alexander Svitov and this pick.

Round four

 The Chicago Blackhawks' fourth-round pick went to the Montreal Canadiens as the result of a trade on June 30, 2002 that sent Sergei Berezin to Chicago in exchange for this pick.
 The Washington Capitals' fourth-round pick went to the Philadelphia Flyers as the result of a trade on February 19, 2004 that sent Jim Vandermeer, Colin Fraser and Los Angeles' second-round pick in 2004 to Chicago in exchange for Alexei Zhamnov and this pick.
Chicago previously acquired this pick as the result of a trade on March 11, 2003 that sent Sergei Berezin to Washington in exchange for this pick.
 The Columbus Blue Jackets' fourth-round pick went to the Tampa Bay Lightning as the result of a trade on January 27, 2004 that sent Alexander Svitov and Tampa Bay's third-round pick in 2004 to Columbus in exchange for Darryl Sydor and this pick.
 The New York Rangers' fourth-round pick went to the Dallas Stars as the result of a trade on November 17, 2003 that sent Jon Klemm and Dallas' second-round pick in 2004 to Chicago in exchange for Stephane Robidas and this pick.
Chicago previously acquired this pick as the result of a trade on January 8, 2003 that sent Boris Mironov to New York in exchange for this pick.
 The Carolina Hurricanes' fourth-round pick went to the Atlanta Thrashers as the result of a trade on June 26, 2004 that sent Atlanta's third-round pick in 2005 to Carolina in exchange for this pick.
 The Mighty Ducks of Anaheim's fourth-round pick went to the Nashville Predators as the result of a trade on June 23, 2003 that sent Chicago's fourth-round pick in 2003 to Anaheim in exchange for the Mighty Duck's fifth-round pick in 2004 and this pick.
 The Boston Bruins compensatory fourth-round pick was received due to the loss of Group III free agent Jeff Hackett.
 The Atlanta Thrashers' fourth-round pick went to the Carolina Hurricanes as the result of a trade on October 3, 2003 that sent Jani Hurme to Atlanta in exchange for this pick.
 The Buffalo Sabres' fourth-round pick went to the Edmonton Oilers as the result of a trade on June 26, 2004 that sent Jason Chimera and Edmonton's third-round pick in 2004 (80th overall) to Phoenix in exchange for New Jersey's second-round pick in 2004 (57th overall) and this pick.
Phoenix previously acquired this pick as the result of a trade on March 10, 2003 that sent Daniel Briere and Phoenix's third-round pick in 2004 to Buffalo in exchange for Chris Gratton and this pick.
 The Edmonton Oilers' fourth-round pick went to the Toronto Maple Leafs as the result of a trade on March 3, 2004 that sent Maxim Kondratyev, Jarkko Immonen, Toronto's first-round pick in 2004 and second-round pick in 2005 to the New York Rangers in exchange for Brian Leetch and future considerations (which became this pick).
New York previously acquired this pick as the result of a trade on June 30, 2003 that sent Brian Leetch to Edmonton in exchange for Jussi Markkanen and this pick.
 The Nashville Predators' fourth-round pick went to the Minnesota Wild as the result of a trade on March 5, 2004 that sent Sergei Zholtok and Brad Bombardir to Nashville in exchange for Buffalo's third-round pick in 2004 and this pick.
 The Montreal Canadiens' fourth-round pick went to the Minnesota Wild as the result of a trade on March 4, 2004 that sent Jim Dowd to Montreal in exchange for this pick.
 The Dallas Stars' fourth-round pick went to the Phoenix Coyotes as the result of a trade on January 16, 2003 that sent Claude Lemieux to Dallas in exchange for Scott Pellerin and this pick (being conditional at the time of the trade). The condition and date of conversion are unknown.
 The Colorado Avalanche's fourth-round pick went to the Chicago Blackhawks as the result of a trade on June 21, 2003 that sent Andrei Nikolishin to Colorado in exchange for future considerations (which became this pick).
 The New Jersey Devils' fourth-round pick went to the Calgary Flames as the result of a trade on July 16, 2003 that sent Bob Boughner to Carolina in exchange for Carolina's fifth-round pick in 2005 and this pick.
Carolina previously acquired this pick as the result of a trade on June 22, 2003 that sent Carolina's fifth and sixth-round picks in 2003 to Columbus in exchange for this pick.
Columbus previously acquired this pick as the result of a trade on March 10, 2003 that sent Grant Marshall to New Jersey in exchange for this pick.
 The Toronto Maple Leafs' fourth-round pick went to the Chicago Blackhawks as the result of a trade on March 11, 2003 that sent Phil Housley to Toronto in exchange for the Leafs' ninth-round pick in 2003 and this pick (being conditional at the time of the trade). The condition – Chicago will receive a fourth-round pick in either 2003 or 2004. The date of conversion is unknown.
 The Boston Bruins' fourth-round pick went to the San Jose Sharks as the result of a trade on January 22, 2003 that sent Jeff Hackett and Jeff Jillson to Boston in exchange for Kyle McLaren and this pick.
 The San Jose Sharks' fourth-round pick went to the New York Rangers as the result of a trade on June 30, 2003 that sent Mark Messier to San Jose in exchange for future considerations (which became this pick).
 The Tampa Bay Lightning's fourth-round pick went to the San Jose Sharks as the result of a trade on June 26, 2004 that sent San Jose's second-round pick in 2004 (63rd overall) to Boston in exchange for Boston's third and ninth-round picks in 2004 (94th and 288th overall) and this pick.
Boston previously acquired this pick as the result of a trade on January 13, 2003 that sent John Grahame to Tampa Bay in exchange for this pick.

Round five

 The Phoenix Coyotes' fifth-round pick went to the Boston Bruins as the result of a trade on May 31, 2003 that sent Darren McLachlan to Phoenix in exchange for this pick.
 The Florida Panthers' fifth-round pick went to the St. Louis Blues as the result of a trade on March 11, 2003 that sent Mike Van Ryn to Florida in exchange for Valeri Bure and this pick (being conditional at the time of the trade). The condition and date of conversion are unknown.
 The Washington Capitals compensatory fifth-round pick was received due to the loss of Group III free agent Ken Klee.
 The Mighty Ducks of Anaheim's fifth-round pick went to the Nashville Predators as the result of a trade on June 23, 2003 that sent Chicago's fourth-round pick in 2003 to Anaheim in exchange for Anaheim's fourth-round pick in 2004 and this pick.
 The Chicago Blackhawks compensatory fifth-round pick was received due to the loss of Group III free agent Chris Simon.
 The Ottawa Senators compensatory fifth-round pick was received due to the loss of Group III free agent Magnus Arvedson.
 The Minnesota Wild's fifth-round pick went to the Philadelphia Flyers as the result of a trade on December 17, 2003 that sent Eric Chouinard to Minnesota in exchange for this pick.
 The St. Louis Blues' fifth-round pick went to the Philadelphia Flyers as the result of trade on February 9, 2004 that sent Eric Weinrich to St. Louis in exchange for this pick.
 The Detroit Red Wings compensatory fifth-round pick was received due to the loss of Group III free agent Luc Robitaille.
 The Calgary Flames' fifth-round pick went to the Florida Panthers as the result of a trade on June 27, 2004 that sent Florida's seventh and eighth-round picks both in 2004 (201st and 234th overall) to San Jose in exchange for this pick.
San Jose previously acquired this pick as the result of a trade on January 9, 2004 that sent Lynn Loyns to Calgary in exchange for this pick.
 The Dallas Stars' fifth-round pick went to the San Jose Sharks as the result of trade on June 26, 2004 that sent San Jose's first-round pick and their compensatory second and third-round picks, all in 2004 (28th, 52nd and 91st overall) to Dallas in exchange for the Stars first-round pick in 2004 (22nd overall) and this pick.
 The Philadelphia Flyers' fifth-round pick went to the Tampa Bay Lightning as the result of a trade on June 27, 2004 that sent Tampa Bay's third-round pick in 2005 to Philadelphia in exchange for Philadelphia and San Jose's sixth-round picks both in 2004 (188th and 191st overall) and this pick.
 The San Jose Sharks' fifth-round pick went to the Minnesota Wild as the result of a trade on March 3, 2004 that sent Jason Marshall to San Jose in exchange for this pick.

Round six

 The Florida Panthers' sixth-round pick went to the Philadelphia Flyers as the result of a trade on June 22, 2003 that sent Philadelphia's seventh-round pick in 2003 to Florida in exchange for this pick.
 The Carolina Hurricanes' sixth-round pick went to the Philadelphia Flyers as the result of a trade on June 21, 2003 that sent Marty Murray to Carolina in exchange for this pick.
 The Atlanta Thrashers' sixth-round pick went to the Calgary Flames as the result of a trade on December 18, 2001 that sent Jeff Cowan and Kurtis Foster to Atlanta in exchange for Petr Buzek and this pick.
 The New Jersey Devils' sixth-round pick was re-acquired as the result of a trade on March 10, 2003 that sent New Jersey's fourth-round pick in 2003 to Atlanta in exchange for Richard Smehlik, New Jersey's eighth-round pick in 2004 and this pick.
Atlanta previously acquired this pick as the result of a trade on February 24, 2003 that sent Pascal Rheaume to New Jersey in exchange for future considerations (which became this pick).

Round seven

Round eight

Round nine

Draftees based on nationality

See also 
2004–05 NHL season
2003 NHL Entry Draft
2005 NHL Entry Draft
List of NHL first overall draft choices
List of NHL players

References

External links 
 2004 NHL Entry Draft player stats at The Internet Hockey Database
 prosportstransactions.com: 2004 NHL Entry Draft Pick Transactions

National Hockey League Entry Draft
Draft